The 2021–22 season was the 125th season in the existence of Udinese Calcio and the club's 27th consecutive season in the top flight of Italian football. In addition to the domestic league, Udinese participated in this season's edition of the Coppa Italia.

Players

Other players under contract
Features player not included in main roster.

Out on loan

Transfers

Pre-season and friendlies

Competitions

Overall record

Serie A

League table

Results summary

Results by round

Matches
The league fixtures were announced on 14 July 2021.

Coppa Italia

Statistics

Appearances and goals

|-
! colspan=14 style=background:#dcdcdc; text-align:center"| Goalkeepers

|-
! colspan=14 style=background:#dcdcdc; text-align:center"| Defenders

|- 
! colspan=14 style=background:#dcdcdc; text-align:center"| Midfielders

|-
! colspan=14 style=background:#dcdcdc; text-align:center"| Forwards

|-
! colspan=14 style=background:#dcdcdc; text-align:center"| Players transferred out during the season

References

Udinese Calcio seasons
Udinese